{{Infobox media franchise
| title     = Duck Commanders media franchise
| creator   = *Duck Commander
Outdoor Channel
A&E
Blaze Media
Fox Entertainment
| owner     = Duck Commander
| years     = 1987–present
| origin    = Duckmen of Louisiana (1987)
| tv_series = 
 Duck Commander, Buck Commander, and Fin Commander series on Outdoor Channel and YouTube
 Duck Dynasty
 Duck Family Treasure
| comics    = 
| films     = The Blind (2023)
| shorts      = Duckmen (1988-2017)
| video_games = 
| books       = 
| music       = 
 Duck the Halls: A Robertson Family Christmas
}}Duck Commander is an American hunting and outdoor recreation company in West Monroe, Louisiana. Founded by Phil Robertson, a football quarterback at Louisiana Tech University, he developed and patented the company's namesake duck call the Duck Commander. He began his business in a dilapidated boat, where he spent 25 years making duck calls from Louisiana cedar trees. Phil and Miss Kay's third son Willie Robertson is the company's chief executive officer. Willie and his wife Korie expanded the business into a multimillion-dollar enterprise. Besides duck-hunting equipment they also manufacture deer-hunting merchandise under the Buck Commander brand, fishing gear with their Fin Commander brand, and turkey-hunting merchandise under the Strut Commander''' brand.

The Robertson family and business are known through their media franchise that has encompassed numerous productions over the years. Including books, video games, toys, and television series such as the Duck Commander, Buck Commander, Fin Commander television shows on the Outdoor Channel and social media, the reality television series Duck Dynasty on A&E, and Duck Family Treasure by Fox Entertainment. They also have their podcasts Duck Call Room hosted by Si, Martin, and Godwin, Unashamed hosted by Phil, Jase, and Alan, and WHOA That's Good Podcast hosted by Sadie Robertson.

 Products 
Duck Commander
Duck calls
Their hallmark product is their duck calls, particularly those designed by Phil Robertson and Jase Robertson. Duck calls are wind instruments, and learning of their unique reeds and design is required for proper usage. Their most popular varieties are the namesake Duck Commander call, the Jase Robertson Pro Series, the Triple Threat (using a triple reed system), the Cut Down 2.0, and others like specialty calls including The Flash Mallard Hen Duck Call and Mallard Drake Reedless Duck Call.

Face Camo
Duck Commander Face Camo is a face paint product, it is used by hunters, athletes, and actors, due to it being smudge-proof.

Buck Commander
Buck Commander is a brand of utilities such as chef cutting boards, and deer calls like the Lil' Doe Bleat can call, Grunt Call, and the Honcho Grunt Call.

Fin Commander
With the Fin Commander brand they sell individual fishing lures and fish hooks, for pan fish, bass, and trout. And kits such as the Crappie Magnet Kit, the Commander Godwin Kit, and the Commander Martin Kit.

Truck Commander
Truck Commander includes accessories and modifications for pickup trucks, sport utility vehicles, and off-road vehicles, intended for use by outdoors enthusiasts. Including floor mats, steering wheel covers, Duck Commander and Buck Commander decals, etc.

Buck Truck
Developed by Truck Hero and ROC & Design, the Buck Truck is a modification set available for Ford F-Series, GMC, Chevrolet, and Toyota trucks.

Other products
Numerous apparel and toy products have been created for Duck Commander, as well as its related brands and media franchise. This includes Halloween costumes, Funko figures, stuffed toys, shirts, etc. Other sporting brands sometimes partner with Duck Commander, such as Garrett Metal Detectors having metal detectors called the Garrett Jase Robertson Signature Edition APEX Metal Detector and the Garrett Jase Robertson Signature Edition AT MAX Metal Detector.

 Media franchise
The Duck Commander media franchise has been produced by numerous media production and broadcasting companies, including Outdoor Channel, A&E (Hearst Communications/The Walt Disney Company), Tyndale House, Blaze Media, Thomas Nelson, Activision, and Fox Entertainment. Usually in the genres of outdoors, sports (hunting, fishing, and metal detecting), reality, and Christian media.

Filmography
Television

Film
The Blind (2023)The Blind is an upcoming 2023 biopic covering the early relationship of Phil and Kay Robertson. Phil Robertson will be portrayed by Aron von Andrian, and Kay Robertson will be portrayed by Amelia Eve. It was filmed during early 2022 in Shreveport, Louisiana.

Music videos

Bibliography
Phil Robertson
Robertson, Phil (2013). Happy, Happy, Happy: My Life and Legacy as the Duck Commander. Howard Books. .
Robertson, Phil (2014). unPHILtered. Howard Books. .
Robertson, Phil and Al Robertson (2014). The Duck Commander Bible: Faith and Family. Thomas Nelson. .
Robertson, Phil and Kay Robertson (2015). Exploring the Joy of Christmas: Stories, Recipes, Carols, and More. Salem Books. .
Robertson, Phil (2019). The Theft of America's Soul: Blowing the Lid Off the Lies That Are Destroying Our Country. Thomas Nelson. .
Robertson, Phil (2020). Jesus Politics: How to Win Back the Soul of America. Thomas Nelson. .
Robertson, Phil (2022). Uncanceled: Finding Meaning and Peace in a Culture of Accusations, Shame, and Condemnation. Thomas Nelson. .

Willie Robertson
Robertson, Willie (2012). The Duck Commander Family: How Faith, Family, and Ducks Created a Dynasty. Howard Books. .
Robertson, Willie (2015). American Hunter: How Legendary Hunters Shaped America. Howard Books. .
Robertson, Willie (2016). American Fisherman: How Our Nation's Anglers Founded, Fed, Financed, and Forever Shaped the U.S.A.. William Morrow. .
Robertson, Willie (2018). American Entrepreneur: How 400 Years of Risk-Takers, Innovators, and Business Visionaries Built the U.S.A.. William Morrow. .

Jase Robertson
Robertson, Jase (2014). Good Call: Reflections on Faith, Family, and Fowl. Howard Books. .

Jep Robertson
Robertson, Jep and Jessica Robertson (2015). The Good, the Bad and the Grace of God: What Honesty and Pain Taught Us About Faith, Family, and Forgiveness. Thomas Nelson. .

Al Robertson
Robertson, Al (2013) The Duck Commander Devotional. Howard Books. .
Robertson, Al and Lisa Robertson (2015). A New Season: A Robertson Family Love Story of Brokenness and Redemption. Howard Books. .
Robertson, Al and Lisa Robertson (2016). The Duck Commander Devotional For Couples. Howard Books. .
Robertson, Al and Lisa Robertson (2019). Desperate Forgiveness: How Mercy Sets You Free. Tyndale House. .

Kay Robertson
Robertson, Kay (2013). Miss Kay's Duck Commander Kitchen: Faith, Family, and Food--Bringing Our Home to Your Table. Howard Books. .
Robertson, Kay (2014). The Women of Duck Commander: Surprising Insights From the Women Behind the Beards About What Makes This Family Work. Howard Books. .
Robertson, Kay (2014). D is for Duck Calls. Simon & Schuster. .
Robertson, Kay (2014). A Robertson Family Christmas. Tyndale House. .
Robertson, Kay (2015). Duck Commander Kitchen Presents Celebrating Family and Friends: Recipes For Every Month of the Year. Howard Books. .

Korie Robertson
Robertson, Korie (2014). Faith Commander: Living Five Values from the Parables of Jesus. Zondervan. .
Robertson, Korie (2015). Strong and Kind: And Other Important Character Traits Your Child Needs to Succeed. Thomas Nelson. .
Robertson, Korie (2015). Duck Commander: Devotions for Kids. Thomas Nelson. .
Robertson, Korie (2017). Duck Commander: Happy, Happy, Happy Stories for Kids. Thomas Nelson. .

Missi Robertson
Robertson, Missi (2015). Blessed, Blessed...Blessed: The Untold Story of Our Family's Fight to Love Hard, Stay Strong, and Keep the Faith When Life Can't Be Fixed. Tyndale Momentum. .
Robertson, Missi (2015). You are Blessed, Blessed...Blessed: A Four-Week Guided Experience for Individuals and Groups. Tyndale Momentum. .
Robertson, Missi and Mia Robertson (2018). Running From Reality. Zonderkidz. .
Robertson, Missi and Mia Robertson (2018). Allie's Bayou Rescue. Zonderkidz. .
Robertson, Missi and Mia Robertson (2018). Dog Show Disaster. Zonderkidz. .
Robertson, Missi and Mia Robertson (2018). Finding Cabin Six. Zonderkidz. .

Lisa Robertson
Robertson, Lisa (2019). The Path of Life: Walking in the Loving Presence of God. Thomas Nelson. .

Si Robertson
Robertson, Si (2013). Si-cology 1: Tales and Wisdom from Duck Dynasty's Favorite Uncle. Howard Books. .
Robertson, Si (2014). Everything's Better with a Beard'. Simon & Schuster. .
Robertson, Si (2014). Uncle Si the Christmas Elf. Simon & Schuster. .
Robertson, Si (2017). Si-renity: How I Stay Calm and Keep the Faith. Howard Books. .

Sadie Robertson
Robertson, Sadie (2014). Live Original: How the Duck Commander Teen Keeps it Real and Stays True to Her Values. Howard Books. .
Robertson, Sadie (2016). Live Original Devotional. Howard Books. .
Robertson, Sadie (2016). Life Just Got Real. Howard Books. .
Robertson, Sadie (2018). Live Fearless: A Call to Power, Passion, and Purpose. Thomas Nelson. .
Robertson, Sadie (2020). Live: Remain Alive, Be Alive at a Specified Time, Have an Exciting or Fulfilling Life. Thomas Nelson. .
Robertson Huff, Sadie (2021). Live on Purpose: 100 Devotions for Letting Go of Fear and Following God. Thomas Nelson. .

John Luke Robertson
Robertson, John Luke (2016). Young and Beardless: The Search for God, Purpose, and a Meaningful Life. Thomas Nelson. .
Robertson, John Luke (2014). Jase & the Deadliest Hunt. Tyndale Kids. .
Robertson, John Luke (2014). Willie's Redneck Time Machine. Tyndale Kids. .
Robertson, John Luke (2014). Si in Space. Tyndale Kids. .
Robertson, John Luke (2014). Phil & the Ghost of Camp Ch-Yo-Ca. Tyndale Kids. .

 Video games 
 Duck Dynasty (2014) 
Duck Dynasty is a 2014 hunting video game published by Activision Blizzard and developed by Fun Labs. It was released on Steam, PlayStation 3, PlayStation 4, Xbox 360, and Xbox One. The game follows John Luke and fictional Cousin Beaux, the player plays as John Luke during various hunting and puzzle mini-games. The Nintendo 3DS version of Duck Dynasty was developed by Black Lantern Studios, and features a top-down perspective and the player controls a "New Guy" in the Duck Commander office, it has its own set of mini-games and is different from the console versions.

 Duck Commander (2015) 
Jakks Pacific developed a light gun shooter handheld TV game, the game featured a green and orange colored light gun.

 Duck Dynasty slot machine (2015) 
In 2015 Bally Technologies created a slot machine based on Duck Dynasty, the game was developed for the Alpha 2 Pro Series cabinet, and it features mini-games themed after frog hunting, archery, and duck hunting.

 Music 
 Christmas album 
The family released a Christmas album, Duck the Halls: A Robertson Family Christmas, on the UMG Nashville label on October 29, 2013.

 Charts 

 Single 

 Podcasts 
Several podcasts have been produced about or by Duck Commander and the Robertson family. Including Unashamed by Phil, Jase, and Alan Robertson, The Duck Call Room hosted by Si, Martin, and Godwin, and WHOA That's Good Podcast'' by Sadie Robertson.

Sports and sponsorships

Duck Commander 500

In 2014, Duck Commander was the title sponsor of the Duck Commander 500, a NASCAR Sprint Cup Series stock car race held at Texas Motor Speedway in Fort Worth, Texas which had been previously sponsored by Samsung, DirecTV, Radio Shack, National Rifle Association, and others. It was replaced by O'Reilly Auto Parts in 2017.

Duck Commander Independence Bowl

Duck Commander also purchased in 2014 the naming rights for college football's Independence Bowl, held each year in Shreveport, Louisiana.

Gallery

References

External links
Official website

Manufacturing companies established in 1972
Manufacturing companies based in Louisiana
Mass media franchises
Privately held companies based in Louisiana
Sporting goods manufacturers of the United States
Tourist attractions in Ouachita Parish, Louisiana
Robertson family
1972 establishments in Louisiana